NGC 4666 is a spiral galaxy in the equatorial constellation of Virgo, located at a distance of approximately  from the Milky Way. It was discovered by the German-born astronomer William Herschel on February 22, 1784. It is a member of the Virgo II Groups, a series of galaxies and galaxy clusters strung out from the southern edge of the Virgo Supercluster. John L. E. Dreyer described it as "bright, very large, much extended 45°±, pretty suddenly brighter middle". It is a member of an interacting system with NGC 4668 and a dwarf galaxy, and belongs to a small group that also includes NGC 4632.

The morphological classification of this galaxy is SABc, which indicates a weak bar around the nucleus with moderately wound spiral arms. There is an active galactic nucleus that shows a modest level of activity and is most likely heavily obscured by gas and dust. The central point source has been detected in the radio and X-ray bands.

This is a starburst galaxy that is noteworthy for its vigorous star formation, which creates an unusual superwind of out-flowing gas. This wind is not visible at optical wavelengths, but is prominent in X-rays, and has been observed by the ESA XMM-Newton space telescope. The estimated star formation rate is  yr–1, with a density of  yr−1 kpc−2. Unlike in many other starburst galaxies, the star formation is spread across the disk rather than being more concentrated.

A type Ib supernova, SN 2019yvr, was detected on 27 December 2019. It has a 0.005 redshift. Images of the location of the supernova before the explosion showed the progenitor star was ~19.

References

External links

 SEDS: NGC 4666
 The Superwind Galaxy NGC 4666, ESO Press Release.

Barred spiral galaxies
Starburst galaxies
4666
Virgo (constellation)
042975